Triplophysa zamegacephala is a species of ray-finned fish in the genus Triplophysaalthough these stone loaches are placed in the genus Qinghaichthys by some authorities. It occurs in the Gaize River in Xinjiang Autonomous Region, China.

Footnotes 

zamegacephala
Fish described in 1985